Age of Empires II: Definitive Edition is a 2019 real-time strategy video game developed by Forgotten Empires and published by Xbox Game Studios. It is a remaster of the 1999 game Age of Empires II: The Age of Kings, celebrating the 20th anniversary of the original. It features significantly improved visuals, supports 4K resolution, and includes all previous expansions from the original and HD Edition. In addition, it includes The Last Khans, an expansion that adds four new civilizations based on Central Asia and Eastern Europe, as well as four new campaigns. The game was released for Windows on November 14, 2019. It was also released for Xbox One and Xbox Series X/S on January 31, 2023.

Gameplay 

The core gameplay elements are shared heavily with the original but Definitive Edition builds upon it. The remaster includes new 4K graphics, new improved visuals for troops and buildings, the ability to zoom in and further out and a new spectator mode. It features a new expansion called The Last Khans and includes four new civilizations: Bulgarians, Cumans, Lithuanians and Tatars. Four new campaigns were added for the new civilizations: Ivaylo, Kotyan Khan, Tamerlane and Pachacuti which is about the Inca civilization and replaces El Dorado from the HD Edition (Lithuanians do not appear as a playable civilization in any campaign; however, they represent Poles in the Ivaylo campaign). It includes all previous expansions from the original (The Conquerors) and HD edition (The Forgotten, The African Kingdoms, Rise of the Rajas).

Players can choose between the original AI, the updated HD Edition AI that was added alongside the HD Edition of the game, and a newer AI developed for the Definitive Edition. The original AI had to cheat to be competitive, while the new AI is advanced enough to not require any cheating. When the old and new AIs were pitted against each other in a test, the new one easily defeated the old one. Unit pathfinding is also supposedly improved upon. Players can shift-queue villager tasks. Farms now have the option to be replenished automatically.

In June 2021, for the first time since Age of Empires Online, co-op campaigns were introduced into the game.

Expansions 
An expansion pack, Lords of the West, was announced on December 15, 2020, and released on January 26, 2021. The Lords of the West expansion introduced two further civilizations, the Burgundians and the Sicilians, as well as three new campaigns, featuring Edward Longshanks, the Dukes of Burgundy, and the Hautevilles.

A second expansion, Dawn of the Dukes, was announced on April 10, 2021, and released on August 10, 2021. It introduced two Central European civilizations, the Poles and the Bohemians, as well as three new campaigns, featuring Jadwiga, Jan Žižka, and Algirdas and Kestutis.

A third expansion, Dynasties of India, was announced on April 14, 2022, and was released on April 28. It features three new civilizations, the Bengalis, the Dravidians, and the Gurjaras. Additionally, the expansion also features reworks to the existing Indian civilization, which was renamed the Hindustani. Three new campaigns, featuring Babur, Rajendra, and Devapala, were also introduced.

To celebrate the franchise’s 25th anniversary a fourth expansion was announced, Return of Rome. It is composed of content from Age of Empires: Definitive Edition brought into the Age of Empires II: Definitive Edition engine.

Release 
On August 21, 2017, at Gamescom, Microsoft announced Age of Empires II: Definitive Edition was in development by Forgotten Empires, Tantalus Media and Wicked Witch Software. On June 9, 2019, Microsoft revealed the gameplay trailer at Xbox E3 2019. It released on the Xbox Game Pass for PC in addition to Steam and the Windows Store on November 14, 2019. A port to the Xbox One and Xbox Series X/S was announced during the 25th anniversary livestream on October 25, 2022, and was released on January 31, 2023. The console version features both gamepad and mouse and keyboard controls, and optional cross-platform play with PC version.

Reception 

Age of Empires II: Definitive Edition received "generally favorable" reviews according to review aggregator Metacritic with a score of 84/100 from 32 reviews. Windows Centrals Cale Hunt praised the improved artwork, animations and quality of life additions but criticized the AI path finding and pointed out a need for further balancing.

Notes

References 

2019 video games
2.2
Cultural depictions of Jan Žižka
Cultural depictions of Joan of Arc
Cultural depictions of Saladin
Cultural depictions of William Wallace
Esports games
Genghis Khan video games
Hussite Wars in popular culture
Multiplayer and single-player video games
Multiplayer online games
Real-time strategy video games
Video game remakes
Video game sequels
Video games developed in the United States
Video games set in the Middle Ages
Video games with expansion packs
Video games with isometric graphics
Video games with Steam Workshop support
Wicked Witch Software games
Windows games
Xbox Cloud Gaming games
Xbox One games
Xbox Series X and Series S games